Leptodiaptomus is a genus of copepods belonging to the family Diaptomidae.

The species of this genus are found in Northern America.

Species

The genus contains the following species:

Leptodiaptomus angustilobus 
Leptodiaptomus ashlandi 
Leptodiaptomus coloradensis 
Leptodiaptomus connexus 
Leptodiaptomus cuauhtemoci 
Leptodiaptomus dodsoni 
Leptodiaptomus insularis 
Leptodiaptomus judayi 
Leptodiaptomus mexicanus 
Leptodiaptomus minutus 
Leptodiaptomus moorei 
Leptodiaptomus natriophilus 
Leptodiaptomus novamexicanus 
Leptodiaptomus nudus 
Leptodiaptomus sicilis 
Leptodiaptomus siciloides 
Leptodiaptomus signicauda 
Leptodiaptomus spinicornis 
Leptodiaptomus tenuicaudatus 
Leptodiaptomus trybomi 
Leptodiaptomus tyrrelli

References

Copepods